This list of notable Ghanaians includes people who were born in Ghana and people who are of Ghanaian ancestry, who are significantly notable for their life and/or work.

University academics

 William Emmanuel Abraham, philosopher, author, and vice chancellor of the University of Ghana
 Kwasi Kwarfo Adarkwa, Ghanaian academician and the immediate past vice chancellor of the Kwame Nkrumah University of Science and Technology
 James Emman Kwegyir Aggrey, intellectual, missionary, and teacher
 Francis Allotey, mathematical physicist
 Joseph Amenowode, academic and politician
 Kwesi Akwansah Andam, author, civil engineer and former Vice Chancellor of KNUST
 Aba Andam, nuclear physicist, lecturer at KNUST
 Kwame Anthony Appiah, philosopher and novelist
 George Ayittey, economist and author
 Robert Patrick Baffour, academic, mechanical engineer and first vice chancellor of the Kwame Nkrumah University of Science and Technology
 Nicholas T. Clerk, academic, administrator and Presbyterian minister
 George C. Clerk, botanist
 Philip Gbeho, teacher, musician, composer of Ghana national anthem
 Akua Kuenyehia, lawyer, judge, former First Vice President of the International Criminal Court, former Dean, Faculty of Law University of Ghana
 Fred McBagonluri, academic, author and inventor
 Daniel Asua Wubah, academic, President of Millersville University

Arts

Sculpture and painting
 Bright Tetteh Ackwerh, sculptor
 Eric Adjetey Anang, sculptor
 Ben Agbee, artist
 Kwame Akoto-Bamfo, sculptor
 El Anatsui, sculptor
 Serge Attukwei Clottey, artist
 Nana Oforiatta Ayim, art historian, curator, filmmaker, writer
 James Cudjoe, painter
 Godfried Donkor, painter and mixed-media artist
 Kimathi Donkor, painter
 Ablade Glover, painter
 Wiz Kudowor, artist
 Theodosia Okoh, artist, designer of Ghana's flag
 Owusu-Ankomah, painter
 Rikki Wemega-Kwawu, artist
 Lynette Yiadom-Boakye, painter

Architecture 
 David Adjaye, architect
 Theodore S. Clerk, urban planner and first Ghanaian professionally certified architect
 Elsie Owusu, founding chair of the Society of Black Architects
 Harry Sawyerr, architect

Fashion
 Joyce Ababio, fashion designer/educationist
 Prisca Abah
 Virgil Abloh, fashion designer
 Adwoa Aboah, supermodel
 Nana Akua Addo
 Hilda Akua, model
 Kofi Ansah, fashion designer
 Aisha Ayensu
 Ozwald Boateng, fashion designer
 Joe Casely-Hayford, fashion designer
 Edward Enninful, editor of British Vogue magazine
 Akpene Diata Hoggar
 Claudia Lumor, fashion magazine publisher and fashion show producer
 Charlotte Mensah
 Ruth Quarshie
 Samata, formerly known as Samata Angel, fashion designer and author
 Sam Sarpong, supermodel
 Kate Tachie-Menson

Photography
 Felicia Ansah Abban
 Philip Kwame Apagya
 James Barnor
 Prince Gyasi

Dancers and dance instructors
 Obo Addy

Business

 Adam Afriyie, British Conservative Party politician and multimillionaire
 George Afriyie, businessman and football administrator
 Roland Agambire
 Prince Kofi Amoabeng
 Abena Amoah
 K. Y. Amoako, international civil servant for the United Nations and businessman
 Anne Amuzu
 Joyce Aryee, businesswoman and politician
 Yvette Adounvo Atekpe
 Georgette Barnes Sakyi-Addo, businesswoman
 Thomas Edward Barter, 17th-century Cape Coast trader
 Marufatu Abiola Bawuah
 Lord Paul Boateng, British Labour Party politician, member of House of Lords, solicitor
 Jesse Edem Cleverson, innovator
 Bernice Dapaah
 Dzigbordi Dosoo
 Sam E Jonah, businessman
 Patricia Obo-Nai
 Kate Quartey-Papafio, businesswoman
 J. K. Siaw
 Winnifred Selby
 Akua Sarpong-Ayisa
 Elizabeth Wyns-Dogbe
 Adowarim Lugu Zuri

Other educators

 Stephen Adei, educationist, writer, economist and motivational speaker
 Gottlieb A. Adom, teacher, journalist and church minister
 James Emman Kwegyir Aggrey, intellectual, missionary, and teacher
 Richard Appiah Akoto, educationalist
 Francis Allotey, mathematical physicist
 Kofi Annan, diplomat and chancellor of the University of Ghana
 Ernest Aryeetey
 Kofi Awoonor, professor and diplomat
 Patrick Awuah, founder and President of Ashesi University
 Edward S. Ayensu, economist, scientist and former chairman of the Council for Scientific and Industrial Research
 George Ayittey, economist, author, professor and president of the Free Africa Foundation
 Kwesi Botchwey, professor and lawyer
 Beattie Casely-Hayford, engineer
 Gus Casely-Hayford, curator and cultural historian
 Alexander Worthy Clerk, missionary and teacher
 Carl Henry Clerk, teacher and church minister
 Jane E. Clerk, teacher and education administrator
 Nicholas Timothy Clerk, missionary and clergyman
 John Atta Mills, former President of the Fourth Republic of Ghana; university professor of law
 Mavis Owureku-Asare
 Priscilla Kolibea Mante
 Marian Asantewah Nkansah

Judiciary
 Mabel Agyemang, Chief Justice Supreme Court of The Gambia
 Daniel Francis Annan, judge
 Joyce Bamford-Addo, judge and barrister
 Amanda Akuokor Clinton
 Vincent Cyril Richard Arthur Charles Crabbe
 Samuel Azu Crabbe
 Jones Victor Mawulorm Dotse
 Thomas Mensah (lawyer), judge and President of Permanent Court of Arbitration
 Sandra Opoku
 Emmanuel Charles Quist, barrister and [[judge, first African Speaker of the Legislative Assembly
 Georgina Theodora Wood, first female Chief Justice of Ghana

Diplomats
 Elizabeth Adjei
 K. B. Asante
 Elsie Addo Awadzi
 Paul Boateng
 Mohammed Ibn Chambas
 Pauline M. Clerk
 Anita Kiki Gbeho
 Akua Kuenyehia
 Amon Nikoi
 Charlotte Osei
 Nathan Quao
 Genevive Delali Tsegah

Film actors and directors

 Ama Abebrese
 Kofi Adjorlolo
 Freema Agyeman, actress
 John Akomfrah, film director and screenwriter
 Amma Asante, Ghanaian-British film writer and director
 Jackie Aygemang, actress
 Mac Jordan Amartey
 Chris Attoh, actor
 Yaba Badoe, filmmaker and writer
 Clara Amoateng Benson
 Thelma Buabeng
 Nadia Buhari, actress
 Akosua Busia, actress
 Paul Danquah, Ghanaian-British actor
 Michael Dapaah
 David Dontoh
 Joselyn Dumas, actress
 John Dumelo
 Idris Elba, actor
 Nii Odartei Evans, actor, producer, voiceover artist
 Boris Kodjoe, actor
 Dayan Kodua
 Anita Kuma
 Peter Mensah, actor
 Majid Michel, actor
 Yvonne Nelson, actress
 Sika Osei
 Nii Kwate Owoo
 Kwame Owusu Ansah
 Kwesi Owusu
 Hugh Quarshie, actor
 Socrate Safo, director
 Bob Santo
 Hailliote Sumney
 Van Vicker, actor
 Zynnell Zuh

Comedians
 Kofi Adu (Agya Koo), actor and comedian
 Michael Blackson, comedian
 Abusuapanin Judas, actor and comedian
 Jacinta Ocansey, comedian
 Bob Santo, actor and comedian

Journalists

 Anas Aremyaw Anas, journalist
 Nana Aba Anamoah, journalist
 Roger A. Agana, journalist
 David Ampofo
 Jemila Abdulai
 Bernard Avle, journalist
 Manasseh Azure, journalist
 Nathaniel Attoh, journalist
 Kweku Baako, Jnr, journalist
 Juliet Bawuah
 Kojo Akoto Boateng, journalist
 Attractive Mustapha, journalist
 Robert Nii Arday Clegg, journalist
 Akua Dansua, journalist
 Ameyaw Debrah, blogger and journalist
 Komla Dumor, journalist
 Cameron Duodu, journalist, broadcaster, writer
 Ekow Eshun, journalist and broadcaster
 Natalie Fort, journalist
 Afua Hirsch, journalist
 Akpene Diata Hoggar, blogger
 Nana Kwadwo Jantuah, journalist
 Isaac Kaledzi, journalist
 Kwami Sefa Kayi, journalist
 Asare Konadu
 Anita Kuma
 Kent Mensah, journalist
 Emma Morrison
 Gamal Nkrumah, journalist, Pan-Africanist and editor
 Samia Nkrumah, journalist
 Pearl Akanya Ofori, journalist
 Edward Oppong Marfo, journalist
 Brigitte Sossou Perenyi
 Jessica Opare Saforo
 Kwaku Sakyi-Addo, journalist

Military figures

 Akwasi Afrifa, soldier and former politician and head of state of Ghana
 Joseph Arthur Ankrah, soldier and second head of state of Ghana
 David Anumle Hansen, Ghana Navy Chief of Naval Staff
 Emmanuel Kwasi Kotoka, lieutenant general; commissioned as a lieutenant in 1954 and seconded to the British army on the Rhine
 Rosamond Asiamah Nkansah (born 1930), first Ghanaian policewoman
 Jerry Rawlings, former president of the Republic of Ghana and Ghana Air Force fighter pilot

Physicians and surgeons

 Oblempong Nii Kojo Ababio V, dental surgeon and traditional ruler
 Kwame Addo-Kufuor, medical doctor
 Raphael Armattoe, doctor, poet, politician
 E. A. Badoe
 John Bilson
 Kofi Boahene
 Peter Bossman, doctor
 Alexander Adu Clerk, sleep medicine specialist and psychiatrist
 Matilda J. Clerk, physician
 Charles Odamtten Easmon, surgeon
 Emmanuel Evans-Anfom, physician and academic
 Kwabena Frimpong-Boateng, cardiothoracic surgeon
 Ernest James Hayford
 Susan Gyankorama De-Graft Johnson
 Emmanuel A. Kissi
 Jacob Kwakye-Maafo, physician and surgeon
 Edward Mahama
 Frederick Nanka-Bruce
 David Ofori-Adjei
 Susan Ofori-Atta
 Benjamin Quartey-Papafio, first Ghanaian to obtain an MD degree
 Bernard Ribeiro, Baron Ribeiro, surgeon and former President of the Royal College of Surgeons of England
 Fred T. Sai, academic and family health physician
 Ellen Boakye
 Afua Adwo Jectey Hesse

Politics

 Felicia Adjei
 Nana Ama Dokua Asiamah Adjei
 Akwasi Afrifa, former President
 Adam Afriyie, British Conservative Party politician and businessman
 Ebenezer Ako-Adjei, nationalist politician and one of The Big Six
 Edward Akufo-Addo, former President and one of The Big Six
 Nana Akufo-Addo, current President of the Republic of Ghana
 Reginald Reynolds Amponsah
 Joseph Arthur Ankrah, former President
 Kofi Annan, 7th UN Secretary-General
 Kojo Asamoa-Caesar, Member, Democratic Party
 William Ofori Atta, politician, founding member of the United Gold Coast Convention, one of The Big Six
 Prosper Douglas Bani, former Chief of Staff
 Albert Adu Boahen
 Lord Paul Boateng, British Labour Party politician, member of House of Lords, solicitor, barrister and businessman
 Peter Bossman, Slovenian politician
 Ama Bame Busia
 Kofi Abrefa Busia, Prime Minister and author
 J. B. Danquah, statesman, pan-Africanist, scholar, historian and one of The Big Six
 Obuobia Darko-Opoku
 Joyce Adwoa Akoh Dei
 James Victor Gbeho, diplomat
 J. E. Casely Hayford, journalist, author, lawyer, educator, and politician
 John Kufuor, former President of Ghana, Global Ambassador against Hunger for UN World Food Programme (WFP)
 Ken Kwaku (born 1946), corporate governance expert
 Kwasi Kwarteng, British Conservative Party politician
 Fiifi Fiavi Kwetey, MP and Minister
 Ambrose Dery, MP and Minister
 Haruna Iddrisu, MP and Minister
 Alan John Kyerematen
 John Dramani Mahama
 John Atta Mills, former President of the Republic of Ghana
 Muntaka Mohammed Mubarak
 Paa Kwesi Nduom
 Kwame Nkrumah, founder of Pan-Africanism, leader of Ghana and its predecessor state, the Gold Coast and one of The Big Six
 Emmanuel Obetsebi-Lamptey, politician, one of the founders and leaders of the United Gold Coast Convention and one of The Big Six
 Jacob Otanka Obetsebi-Lamptey
 Nii Amaa Ollennu, Chairman of the Presidential Commission and acting President of Ghana during the Second Republic from 7 August 1970 to 31 August 1970
 Aaron Mike Oquaye
 Victor Owusu
 Kwadwo Baah Wiredu, former MP and Finance Minister
 Kojo Oppong Nkrumah, politician, journalist
 Nana Akua Owusu Afriyie
 Naana Eyiah Quansah
 Abena Durowaa Mensah
 Cynthia Mamle Morrison
 Tina Gifty Naa Ayele Mensah
 Jerry Rawlings, former President
 Charles Wereko-Brobby

Sports

 Osumanu Adama, world champion boxer
 Azume Adams
 Rev Osei Kofi
 Joseph Addai, American football player
 Freddy Adu, footballer
 Harry Aikines-Aryeetey, sprinter
 Vida Anim, athlete
 Ezekiel Ansah, American football player
 Stephen Appiah, footballer, former captain of The Black Stars
 Kwadwo Asamoah, footballer currently with Inter
 Anita Asante, English soccer player
 André Ayew, Swansea City footballer
 Jordan Ayew, Crystal Palace footballer, brother of André Ayew
 Mario Balotelli, footballer, currently with OGC Nice
 Jérôme Boateng, footballer currently with Bayern Munich
 Kwame Ayew
 Kevin-Prince Boateng, footballer, currently with UD Las Palmas
 Joshua Clottey, former world champion boxer
 Marcel Desailly, former French footballer
 Michael Essien, footballer
 Ignisious Gaisah, athlete
 Kim Grant, footballer
 Asamoah Gyan, footballer
 Kofi Kingston, professional wrestler
 Nana Yaw Konadu, world champion boxer
 John Mensah, footballer
 Pops Mensah-Bonsu, basketball player
 Azumah Nelson, world champion boxer
 Kwame Nkrumah-Acheampong, skier
 John Paintsil, footballer
 Abedi Pele, footballer
 Clement Quartey, olympic boxing silver medalist
 Ike Quartey, former world champion boxer
 Danny Welbeck, association footballer currently with Arsenal and the England national football team
 Arthur Wharton, the first black professional association football player in the world
 Rachel Yankey, footballer
 Tony Yeboah, footballer
 Thomas Partey, footballer
 Timothy Fosu-Mensah, footballer
 Stephen Appiah, former footballer
 Abdul Baba Rahman, footballer
 Kevin-Prince Boateng
 Charles Asampong Taylor
 Bernard Dong Bortey
 Issac Dogboe, world champion boxer
 Vida Opoku
 Lydia Mato
 Juliana Kakraba
 Winnifred Ntumi
 Rose Amoanimaa Yeboah
 Abigail Kwarteng
 Habiba Atta Forson
 Kofi Sarkodie

Media

 Dzifa Affainie
 Nana Aba Anamoah, Media Personality
 Nana Yaa Serwaa Sarpong, Media Personality and Entrepreneur
 Anas Aremeyaw Anas
 Roger A. Agana
 Scofray Nana Yaw Yeboah Golden City Business Magazine
 Terry Baddoo, journalist and television news presenter
 Margaret Busby, editor and publisher, founder of Allison & Busby
 Ameyaw Debrah, blogger, publisher celebrity blogger
 Marcel Desailly, pundit and former footballer
 Afua Hirsch, journalist and television news presenter
 Ras Kwame, DJ and radio presenter
 Ras Mubarak, media consultant
 Deborah Owusu-Bonsu, television presenter
 Amoaning Samuel, blogger and radio personality
 June Sarpong, television presenter
 Oral Ofori, digital storyteller
 Mahama Shaibu
 Alhassan Suhuyini, broadcast journalist
 Reggie Yates, television presenter

Writers and poets

 Ama Ata Aidoo, writer
 Mohammed Naseehu Ali, writer and musician
 Kofi Anyidoho, poet and academic
 Ayi Kwei Armah, novelist and social critic
 Ayesha Harruna Attah, writer
 Kofi Awoonor, poet and academic
 J. Benibengor Blay
 William Boyd, novelist and screenwriter (born in Accra)
 Roseanne A. Brown, fantasy and Young adult fiction novelist
 Mabel Dove Danquah, journalist, political activist and creative writer
 Amma Darko, novelist
 Kwame Dawes, poet, editor and critic
 Joe de Graft, playwright and dramatist
 Amu Djoleto, poet and educator
 W. E. B. Du Bois, author, editor, sociologist, historian, civil rights activist and Pan-Africanist
 Kodwo Eshun, writer, theorist and filmmaker
 Yaa Gyasi, novelist
 Kojo Laing, novelist
 Lesley Lokko, novelist and architect
 Atukwei Okai, poet, cultural activist and academic
 Francis Ernest Kobina Parkes, poet
 Nii Parkes, author, publisher and social commentator
 Taiye Selasi
 Efua Sutherland, playwright, poet and dramatist
 Empi Baryeh
 Portia Dery
 Nana Sandy Achampong, novelist, poet and academic

Artists 

 Akosua Agyapong
 Kofi Owusu Dua Anto
 Kojo Antwi
 Kojo Funds
 Becca
 Lethal Bizzle
 Adeline Ama Buabeng, actress and storyteller
 C-Real
 Castro
 A. B. Crentsil
 Rocky Dawuni
 Amakye Dede
 Donae'o
 Bisa Kdei
 Samini
 E.L
 Efya
 Fuse ODG
 Kofi Ghanaba
 Eshun
 Jay Ghartey
 Sherifa Gunu
 Joey B
 Kesse
 Amerado
 Kofi Kinaata
 Pappy Kojo
 Medikal
 Daddy Lumba
 Nayaah
 Agya Koo Nimo
 Nii Okai
 Osibisa
 Dizzee Rascal
 Raye
 Reggie Rockstone
 Sarkodie
 Esther Smith
 Stonebwoy
 Stormzy
 Sway
 Tempa T
 Tricky (musician)
 Shatta Wale
 Ebony Reigns
 Wendy Shay
 R2Bees
 Sarkodie
 Kuami Eugene
 Kwesi Arthur
 KiDi
 Darkovibes
 Ebony
 Wiyala
 Rocky Dawuni

Gospel artists
 Majesty
 Joe Beecham
 Helen Yawson
 Joe Mettle
 Diana Hamilton
 Daughters of Glorious Jesus

Information and communications technology
 Mohammed-Sani Abdulai

Activists 
 Stella Saaka
 Juliana Dogbadzi
 Abena Dugan
 Afi Azaratu Yakubu

Inventors and innovators
 Herman Chinery-Hesse
 Thomas Mensah
 Ave Kludze
 Bright Simons
 Fred McBagonluri
 Kojo Sarfo Kantanka
 Alexander Anim-Mensah

Others
 Harriet Bruce-Annan (born 1965), humanitarian
 Efua Asibon
 Ama Hemmah
 Nana Yaw Nkrumah, record producer and sound engineer
 Felicia Edem Attipoe
 Eva Mends, economist
 Ruth Ama Gyan-Darkwa
 DJ Zel
 Molly Germaine Prempeh
 John Collins, UK born-Ghanaian guitarist, harmonica player and percussionist
 Daniel Yaw Domelevo, Ghanaian Auditor-General of Ghana
 Scofray Nana Yaw Yeboah, transformational coach, certified professional corporate trainer and consultant

See also 

 Ghanaian Americans
 Ghanaians in the United Kingdom
 Gold Coast Euro-Africans
 White Ghanaian
 List of historical Ghanaian traditional rulers
 List of Ghanaian actors
 List of Ghanaian filmmakers
 List of Ghanaian musicians
 List of writers from Ghana

References